Abergavenny's town walls are a sequence of defensive walls built around the town of Abergavenny in Monmouthshire, Wales.

History
After the Norman invasion of Wales in the 11th century, a castle was built at Abergavenny; this included a relatively small, walled town. This town had a rectangle of wooden walls, protected by a "V" shaped ditch, stopping just short of the modern Cross Street. In the 12th century this ditch was filled in, possibly because of a pressure on land in the town, and the town of Abergavenny then appears to have lacked any defences until the late 13th century.

In the late 13th century a larger town wall was built around Abergavenny in stone, forming an oval shape, approximately 350 m by 215 m across. The wall was paid for and maintained by murage, by which the king allowed a city to raise taxes on the imports of particular goods.

By the 21st century, only occasional masonry remains of the medieval walls, although the line of the wall can be seen in the form of later buildings and walls.

See also
 List of town walls in England and Wales
Chester city walls
York city walls

References

Bibliography
Clarke, Stephen and Jane Bray. (2003) "The Norman town defences of Abergavenny," Medieval Archaeology Vol. 27, pp. 186–189.
Creighton, Oliver Hamilton and Robert Higham. (2005) Medieval Town Walls: an Archaeology and Social History of Urban Defence. Stroud, UK: Tempus. .

City walls in the United Kingdom
Abergavenny
Grade II listed buildings in Monmouthshire